The Force India VJM11 is a Formula One racing car designed and constructed by Force India to compete during the 2018 FIA Formula One World Championship. The car was driven by Sergio Pérez and Esteban Ocon, and made its competitive début at the 2018 Australian Grand Prix. Following the bankruptcy of the Force India team, the Force India assets were purchased—including the VJM11 design and built cars—by a new team, Racing Point Force India, who continued to enter the VJM11 under the Force India name.

Complete Formula One results
(key) (results in bold indicate pole position; results in italics indicate fastest lap)

Notes

References

External links

Force India Formula One cars
2018 Formula One season cars
VJM11